The Stone Sculpture Park is a park in Banqiao District, New Taipei, Taiwan.

Architecture
The park consists of stone landscape area, gazebo, fish pond, statues, totem, etc.

Transportation
The wetland is accessible within walking distance west of Jiangzicui Station of Taipei Metro.

See also
 Geography of Taiwan

References

Parks in Taiwan
Tourist attractions in New Taipei